Bar End is an area of Winchester, Hampshire, England. It lies on the east bank of the River Itchen to the north of St. Catherine's Hill and is the location of a park and ride car park serving the city centre.

Villages in Hampshire